The 1941 season was Wisła Krakóws 33rd year as a club.

Friendlies

Okupacyjne Mistrzostwa Krakowa

External links
1941 Wisła Kraków season at historiawisly.pl

Wisła Kraków seasons
Association football clubs 1941 season
Wisla